Dr. Ewan Affleck,  is a family physician in Yellowknife, Northwest Territories, Canada. In 2013 he was named to the Order of Canada for his work in electronic medical records.

References

Living people
Canadian general practitioners
Members of the Order of Canada
Place of birth missing (living people)
Year of birth missing (living people)
21st-century Canadian people